HMS Havelock was an  monitor of the Royal Navy that saw service in the First World War.

Background
On 3 November 1914, Charles M. Schwab of Bethlehem Steel offered Winston Churchill, then First Lord of the Admiralty, the use of four /45cal BL MK II twin gun turrets, originally destined for the Greek ship .  These turrets could not be delivered to the German builders, due to the British naval blockade.  The Royal Navy immediately designed a class of monitors, designed for shore bombardment, to use the turrets.

HMS Havelock was laid down at the Harland and Wolff Ltd shipyard at Belfast on 12 December 1914.  The ship was named General Grant in honour of the United States General Ulysses S Grant, however as the United States was still neutral, the ship was hurriedly renamed HMS M2 on 31 May 1915.  She was then named HMS Havelock on 20 June 1915.

Service history
HMS Havelock sailed for the Dardanelles in June 1915. She remained in the Eastern Mediterranean until returning to England in January 1916.  She then served as a guard ship at Lowestoft. She was decommissioned in May 1919, and disarmed in June 1920.  Sold for breaking up in May 1921, she was retained in reserve until resold on 25 June 1927 to the Ward shipyard at Preston for breaking up.

References
 
 Dittmar, F. J. & Colledge, J. J., "British Warships 1914-1919", (Ian Allan, London, 1972), 
 Gray, Randal (ed), "Conway's All the World's Fighting Ships 1906–1921", (Conway Maritime Press, London, 1985), 

 

Abercrombie-class monitors
Ships built in Belfast
1915 ships
World War I monitors of the United Kingdom
Ships built by Harland and Wolff